Mount Blanchet Provincial Park is a provincial park in British Columbia, Canada, located on the west side of the southern end of Takla Lake, north of Smithers.

References
BC Park webpage

Provincial parks of British Columbia
Omineca Country
Regional District of Bulkley-Nechako
2001 establishments in British Columbia
Protected areas established in 2001